Marguerite-Louise Odiot de Montroty, stage name Sophie Lothaire (born 1732 in Paris) was a French dancer, actress and director who spent her whole career at the Théâtre de la Monnaie in Brussels.

Life
She began as a figurative dancer, from 1753 to 1772, under the name of Mlle Sophie, before becoming an actress until 1775. In 1762, Chevrier wrote that "she plays all sorts of roles indifferent well - she shares, by economy, the reading of sieur Duranci".

In 1766, the comic-actors clubbed together to head the Théâtre de Bruxelles.  This association was made up of D'Hannetaire and his two daughters Eugénie and Angélique, Mlle Rosalide, Compain, Prévost, Le Petit, Dubois, Durancy, D'Rozely, Serville, Grégoire, Mme Granier, Suzette Defoye and Sophie Lothaire.

From 1777 to 1783, Sophie Lothaire shared the direction of the theatre with Louis-Jean Pin and Alexandre Bultos.  When this arrangement hit financial difficulties, she returned to France, to Versailles, where she tried to recoup the sums still owed to her.

References 

 Isnardon. Jacques: Le théâtre de la Monnaie : depuis sa fondation jusqu'à nos jours" (1890)

1732 births
18th-century French dancers
18th-century French actresses
French stage actresses
Actresses from Paris
Directors of La Monnaie
Entertainers of the Austrian Netherlands
Year of death missing
French female dancers
18th-century theatre managers
Women of the Austrian Netherlands